Sylvie Willard (born 7 August 1952) is a French bridge player. Sometime prior to the 2014 European and World meets (summer and October) ranked 4th among 73 living Women World Grand Masters by world masterpoints (MP) and 8th by placing points that do not decay over time.

Life

Willard was born in Trébeurden on the coast near the northwest tip of France. She was one of 8 children of Nicole and Irénée Bajos de Heredia. Her father barred bridge from the home as a threat to education and invited Sylvie only at age 18 to play the game with him elsewhere. She earned a degree in computer science and studied bridge afterward. As of 2011: she is married and separated; her children Isabelle of Los Angeles and Fabrice of Paris are 34 and 33. Her husband François is a director and their son Fabrice has participated in some EBL and WBF bridge tournaments including 1998 play on the France juniors team (under-26 years).

Career

In competition among national women teams, she is a 2-time world champion, winning the biennial Venice Cup in 2005, 2011 and 2015. France also won the 2002 Olympic Grand Prix, women's flight, a non-medal event in association with the Salt Lake City Winter Olympic Games. (The Olympic movement rejected bridge for the regular summer or winter program and the World Mind Sports Games were inaugurated in 2008.) 
She is a 7-time European Bridge League champion from 1979 to 2010 (Google Translate: "New leader of the European classification"; "This year,
she moved to first place in the European rankings.").

Willard and her current longtime regular bridge partner Bénédicte Cronier (Women World Grand Master, recently 8th-ranking by MP) are both residents of Paris. For several years they have frequently participated in the North American Bridge Championships, thrice-annual 10-day meets organized by the American Contract Bridge League (ACBL). They were co-recipients of the ACBL's annual Sidney H. Lazard Jr. Sportsmanship Award in 2013. According to selection chairman Sidney H. Lazard (Sr.), "These women are the epitome of grace, good manners, cheerfulness and sportsmanship, making the bridge experience more pleasurable for everyone."

Bridge accomplishments

Honours

 ACBL Sportsmanship Award 2013

Wins

 Venice Cup (2) 2005, 2011 and 2015 
 North American Bridge Championships (6)
 Machlin Women's Swiss Teams (1) 2011 
 Wagar Women's Knockout Teams (1) 2011 
 Sternberg Women's Board-a-Match Teams (3) 2009, 2010, 2013 
 Chicago Mixed Board-a-Match (1) 2009

Runners-up

 Venice Cup (2) 1987, 2001 
 North American Bridge Championships (3)
 Wagar Women's Knockout Teams (2) 2012, 2013 
 Sternberg Women's Board-a-Match Teams (1) 2012

References

External links
 
 
 Sylvie Willard Gombert at infobridge.it 
 Women Stars at the World Bridge Federation – with biographies (none yet for Willard)
 WILLARD Sylvie athlete information at the 1st SportAccord World Mind Games (2011)
 ACBL 2013 Sportsmanship Award at Bridge Winners, 10 December 2012
 

1952 births
French contract bridge players
Venice Cup players
Sportspeople from Côtes-d'Armor
Living people
French women